Dalila Jakupović was the defending champion, but lost in the second round to Deborah Chiesa.

Tamara Korpatsch won the title, defeating Chiesa in the final 2–6, 7–6(7–5), 6–2.

Seeds

Draw

Finals

Top half

Bottom half

References
Main Draw

Ladies Open Hechingen - Singles